Pedro Patiño Ixtolinque (San Pedro Ecatzingo, 1774 - 1835, Mexico City) was a mixed-race Mexican sculptor. His father was Spanish and his mother a mestiza (mixed Indian and European). He won a scholarship at the Academy of San Carlos that was "reserved for 'pure New Spanish Indians," through his father's line; his father claimed to be a cacique of Coyoacan, conferring indigenous noble status on his son Pedro. When Patiño Ixtolinque petitioned for the title of Academician of Merit," he had to argue for his status as a Spaniard, since Indians were excluded from holding the title. He was declared a "Spaniard", "arguing that 'Spanish' simply meant 'not a foreigner'." At the Academy he studied with Santiago Sandoval and Manuel Tolsá. He worked with Tolsá to create the tabernacle for the Puebla Cathedral.  He created the altar and altarpiece for the tabernacle at the Mexico City Metropolitan Cathedral, as well as various other works for cathedrals in Mexico.

Following Mexican independence in 1821, Patiño Ixtolinque was chosen to create a statue of independence hero, Father José María Morelos.  In 1830 Patiño Ixtolinque sculpted an image of America, in the iconic form of a stylized indigenous woman bedecked in feathers and carrying a bow and arrow.

References

1774 births
1835 deaths
Mexican sculptors
Male sculptors
Mexican people of indigenous peoples descent